Indian Normal School may refer to:

Indian Normal School of Robeson County, a predecessor of University of North Carolina at Pembroke
St. Joseph Indian Normal School
Indian Female Normal School and Instruction Society, former name for International Service Fellowship
United States Indian Training and Normal School, a former name for Chemawa Indian School